Abraham Turgeon (February 14, 1783 – August 2, 1851) was a notary and political figure in Canada East. He represented Bellechasse in the Legislative Assembly of the Province of Canada from 1842 to 1844.

He was born in Saint-Michel, Bellechasse County, the son of François Turgeon and Geneviève Bauché. Turgeon apprenticed as a notary with Louis Turgeon, qualified to practise in 1804 and set up office in Saint-Gervais. He served in the militia during the War of 1812, later reaching the rank of lieutenant-colonel. In 1814, he was named a justice of the peace; Turgeon also was a commissioner of roads and census commissioner for Hertford County. In 1819, he married Monique Goulet. Turgeon was elected to the assembly in an 1842 by-election held after Augustin-Guillaume Ruel accepted an appointment as district registrar; he did not run for reelection in 1844. Turgeon died in Saint-Michel at the age of 68.

His sister Geneviève married his cousin Louis Turgeon, who served in the assembly for Lower Canada.

References 
 

1783 births
1851 deaths
Members of the Legislative Assembly of the Province of Canada from Canada East
Canadian justices of the peace
People from Chaudière-Appalaches